Thrissur City Police (TCP) (Malayalam തൃശൂര്‍ സിറ്റി പോലീസ്‌ ), a division of the Kerala Police, is the law enforcement agency for the City of Thrissur, Kunnamkulam and the temple town of Guruvayoor. The city police force is headed by a Commissioner of Police, an IPS officer, and the administrative control vests with the Home Ministry of Kerala. Thrissur City Police is the largest Police District in Kerala state covering an area of 570.79 Square kilometre.

The city police came into existence on March 3, 2011, after dividing the Thrissur District Police. The police commissionerate is situated in Thrissur City. The commissionerate cover 24 police stations and has four sub-divisions, Thrissur, Ollur, Guruvayur and Kunnamkulam. Ankit Asok is the current Commissioner of Police.

Police Stations under Thrissur Commissionerate
Cyber Police station Thrissur City

Thrissur Subdivision
 Town East Police Station
 Town West Police Station
 Traffic Police Station
 Vanitha Police Station
 Nedupuzha Police Station
 Permangalam Police Station
 Medical College Police Station
 District Command and Control Room

Ollur Subdivision
 Ollur Police Station
 Mannuthy Police Station
 Peechi Police Station
 Viyyur Police Station

Guruvayur Subdivision
 Temple Police Station
 Guruvayur Police Station
 Pavaratty Police Station
 Chavakkad Police Station
 Vadakkekad Police Station
 Munakkakadavu Costal Police Station

Kunnamkulam Subdivision
 Kunnamkulam Police Station
 Erumapetty Police Station
 Wadakkancheery Police Station
 Cheruthuruthy Police Station
 Chelakkara Police Station
 Pazhayannur Police Station

Thrissur Police Commissioners
 1. P Vijayan (3 March 2011 – 31 December 2012)
 2. P. Prakash (1 January 2013 – 22 August 2014)
 3. Jacob Thomas (23 August 2014 – 11 February 2015)
 4. R. Nishanthini (12 February 2015 – 14 July 2015)
 5. K.G. Simon (15 July 2015 – 12 June 2016)
 6. Dr J. Himendranath (13 June 2016 – 6 January 2017)
 7. T. Narayanan (6 January 2017 – 9 August 2017)
 8. Rahul R Nair (10 August 2017 – 8 May 2018)
 9. G.H. Yatheesh Chandra (9 May 2018 - 8 January 2020)
 10. R. Adithya ( 8 January 2020 - 15 November 2022)
 11. Ankit Asok (19.11.2022 - present)

References

Government of Kerala
Government of Thrissur
Organisations based in Thrissur
Metropolitan law enforcement agencies of India
Kerala Police
2011 establishments in Kerala
Government agencies established in 2011